Richard George Petrie (born 23 August 1967) is a former New Zealand international cricketer who played 12 One Day Internationals.

In February 2020, he was named in New Zealand's squad for the Over-50s Cricket World Cup in South Africa. However, the tournament was cancelled during the third round of matches due to the coronavirus pandemic.

References

External links 
 

1967 births
Living people
New Zealand cricketers
New Zealand One Day International cricketers
Canterbury cricketers
Wellington cricketers
People educated at Shirley Boys' High School